Everybody Makes Mistakes may refer to:

 Everybody Makes Mistakes (Starflyer 59 album), 1999
 Everybody Makes Mistakes (Shearwater album), 2002
 "Everybody Makes Mistakes", a song by Lacy J. Dalton from her 1981 album Takin' It Easy
 "Everybody Makes Mistakes", a song by Monrose from the album Strictly Physical (album)